The Gregg Allman Band, also known as Gregg Allman & Friends, was a Southern rock/blues rock group that Gregg Allman established and had led since the 1970s, during periods when Allman has been recording and performing separate from the Allman Brothers Band and has chosen not to perform exclusively as a solo artist.

Line ups

1984-1988
(At the time of I'm No Angel and Just Before The Bullets Fly)

Gregg Allman – Hammond Organ, Acoustic and Electric Guitar, Lead Vocals
Dan Toler – Guitar
David Toler – Drums
Bruce Waibel – Bass Guitar, Background Vocals
Tim Heding – Keyboards, Background Vocals
Charles "Chaz" Trippy – Percussion

More recent line up
 Gregg Allman – Vocals, guitar, Hammond B-3
 Floyd Miles – Percussion, vocals
 Bruce Katz – Keyboards
 Scott Sharrard  – Guitar
 Jerry Jemmott – Bass
 Steve Potts – Drums
 Jay Collins – Horns

Death
The band dissolved following the death of Gregg Allman in May 2017. 

Floyd Miles died on 26 January 2018, at the age of 74.

References

External links
 

American blues rock musical groups
The Allman Brothers Band
Musical groups established in 1986
American southern rock musical groups